Die Fastnachtsbeichte, op. 90, (Carnival Confession) is an opera in two acts by Giselher Klebe. His wife, Lore Klebe, wrote the libretto based on the novella of the same name by Carl Zuckmayer.

The opera premiered on 20 December 1983 at the Staatstheater Darmstadt, directed by Kurt Horres and conducted by Hans Drewanz.

German-language operas
Operas by Giselher Klebe
Operas
1983 operas
Operas based on novels